Below Zero is the 13th studio album by the Finnish avant-garde progressive metal band Waltari. A music video was made for the song "In the Cradle".

Track listing

 "Below Zero" - 5:10
 "I Hear Voices" - 5:31
 "In the Cradle" - 3:47
 "Without Lies" - 4:07
 "Dubbed World" - 3:57
 "Endless Highway" - 4:51
 "Syntax Error" - 4:31
 "My Own Satisfaction" - 4:13
 "10 Reasons Why Not to Hate Me" - 4:19
 "Travel On" - 4:10

Credits
Kärtsy Hatakka - Vocals, bass, keyboards, programming
Sami Yli-Sirniö - Guitar
Jariot Lehtinen - Guitar
Janne Immonen - Keyboards, programming
Ville Vehvilainen - Drums

External links
Encyclopaedia Metallum page

References

Waltari albums
2009 albums